José María Piriz (born April 1, 1943) is a former Uruguayan footballer who played for clubs in Uruguay, Chile and Ecuador.

Career
Piriz was born in Rivera and played for Rampla Juniors. He transferred to Ecuadorian soccer in 1966 to play for Deportivo Quito.

The following year, he played in the Copa Libertadores de America with Emelec, where his performance impressed the manager of Colo-Colo of Chile who signed him up; he excelled in the 'Araucanian cacique'.

Despite this, Piriz had a reputation as an "evil genius" in the Chilean club, because, in a game against Rangers de Talca, he assaulted another player, Aldo Valentini. The conflict between the two 'colocolinos' was initiated by Piriz, who insulted Valentini. Piriz landed a severe blow on the other player. The referee Ricardo Romero, according to the regulations, sent off the Uruguayan player while Valentini spent several minutes trying to recover from the assault.

Piriz was nevertheless champion of Chilean soccer with Albos in 1970, playing alongside Carlos Caszely and Francisco Valdés.

Teams
  Rampla Juniors 1965
  Deportivo Quito 1966
  Emelec 1967
  Colo-Colo 1968–1970
  Emelec 1971–1974
  LDU Portoviejo 1974

References

1943 births
Living people
Uruguayan footballers
Uruguayan expatriate footballers
Rampla Juniors players
L.D.U. Portoviejo footballers
S.D. Quito footballers
C.S. Emelec footballers
Colo-Colo footballers
Chilean Primera División players
Expatriate footballers in Chile
Uruguayan expatriate sportspeople in Chile
Expatriate footballers in Ecuador
Uruguayan expatriate sportspeople in Ecuador
Association football forwards